Mubarak Al-Sultan (born 31 July 1993) is a Saudi football player. He currently plays for Al-Taraf as a winger .

References

External links
 

1993 births
Living people
Saudi Arabian footballers
Al-Fateh SC players
Al Jeel Club players
Al-Rawdhah Club players
Al-Nojoom FC players
Mudhar Club players
Al-Taraf Club players
Saudi Professional League players
Saudi First Division League players
Saudi Second Division players
Saudi Third Division players
Saudi Fourth Division players
Association football wingers
Saudi Arabian Shia Muslims